Anti-pedophile activism encompasses opposition to pedophiles, pedophile advocacy groups, child pornography, and child sexual abuse. Much of the direct action classified as "anti-pedophile" involves demonstrations against sex offenders, against groups advocating age of consent reform, legalization of sexual activity between adults and children, and against Internet users who solicit sex from underage children and teenagers.

History
Organized social activism against child sexual molesters occurred in the 18th century, by the Society for the Reformation of Manners.

The National Vigilance Association was a British society established in August 1885 for the enforcement and improvement of the laws for the repression of criminal vice and public immorality, in response to articles exposing child prostitution published by W. T. Stead in the Pall Mall Gazette.

Modern times
In 2000, some local groups took to marching in opposition to the locations of various child sex offenders following a media campaign of "naming and shaming" suspected pedophiles in the United Kingdom.  In the Netherlands, the pedophile activist group Vereniging Martijn has been protested against by the far right Nationale Alliantie. In the UK, the far right National Front party was protesting in front of Paedophile Information Exchange conferences in the 1970s and against the Rotherham child sexual exploitation scandal in 2014, alongside EDL and BNP. There have been incidents in which vigilantism intended to be against pedophiles has been mistakenly directed against the wrong person, including:
 A mob confusing a pediatrician with a pedophile, due to the similarities between the words.
 An incident where a man was misidentified as a pedophile because he was wearing a neck brace similar to the one a sex offender was wearing when pictured in a newspaper.

Groups

The Blue Angel Association 
A French group who successfully sued Gabriel Matzneff in 2020.

Perverted-Justice 

Perverted-Justice was an anti-pedophilia, anti-hebephilia, and anti-statutory rape organization with the stated mission to expose and convict adults who solicit and groom minors on the Internet. Perverted Justice had multiple issues with being able to supply chat log evidence in a manner that passes legal scrutiny.

Jewish Community Watch
Jewish Community Watch, a global New York City-based organization with an office in Israel, focusing on prevention of child sexual abuse in the Orthodox Jewish community, received mixed support over their posting the names of suspected pedophiles on their main website. The column titled the "Wall of Shame" listed the names of individuals suspected of abuse, their photos and testimonies from alleged victims.

Letzgo Hunting

Letzgo Hunting is an Internet-based anti-paedophilia vigilante group based in Barwell, Leicestershire, England. A man committed suicide days after being accused and "named and shamed" of being a paedophile by the group. Jim Gamble, formerly chief executive of the Child Exploitation and Online Protection Centre, has described the activities of the group as "deeply disturbing".

Others 
Another initiative, Predator Hunter, headed by Wendell Kreuth, aims to track down and expose the pornography-related activities of alleged 'sexual predators', as disclosed in his interview with Minnesota Public Radio. The activities of Predator Hunter in the previous years garnered more attention, particularly the actions of Bradley Willman, whose anti-pedophile activism is described below:
Between 1997 and 2001, Brad Willman was known as Omni-Potent, an Internet vigilante who would track pedophiles by spending 16-plus hours a day hacking into people's computers from his parents’ house in Langley, a suburban community just outside Vancouver. Ultimately, he was responsible for the arrests of about 40 pedophiles across Canada and the U.S. Willman's successful, albeit unpaid and short-lived venture as "Citizen Tipster," as he was known by police, is now over. But his activities have sparked intense debate over the legality of his tactics.See also Casey, Eoghan, Digital Evidence and Computer Crime: Forensic Science, Computers and the Internet. London: Academic Press, 2004. pg. 580 
He would verify where suspects were from, and send the information on to Predator-Hunter, an online pedophile watchdog group that would, in turn, send it to other sources to be verified before passing it on to police. "Parents in a number of countries, I think, owe OmniPotent a debt of gratitude for what he did," says Wendell Krueth, president of Predator-Hunter. The end justifying the means is a concept Predator-Hunter supports. "We don't tell people to go hack, but we consider whatever information we get worthy in taking down pedophiles," Krueth says.

Silentlambs and LambsRoar are both web-based anti-pedophile groups that seek to protect children through education, to provide legal assistance, and to provide assistance to victims [survivors] who have been molested as children and silenced from speaking out or seeking proper assistance as directed by religious authorities. To date, most emphasis has been on abuse within the Jehovah's Witness community.

In several instances, members of 4chan and Anonymous have been involved in drawing attention to or gathering evidence regarding suspected pedophiles on the Internet. Members of Anonymous were identified as responsible for the arrest of suspected pedophile Chris Forcand. They contacted the police after some members were "propositioned" by Forcand with "disgusting photos of himself". Anonymous were described as "cyber-vigilantes who seek to out anyone who presents with a sexual interest in children".

Anonymous, a hacktivist group, claimed to intrude on the various servers hosting child pornography resources and pull a various sensitive information—emails, forums' personal messages, credit card details, webserver logs etc. -- on the users of such websites.

Creep Catchers refers to non-affiliated individuals and groups which operate in 15 cities across Canada, posing as children in chat rooms to sting, record and shame adults who try to meet them for sex. POP Squad ("POP" standing for "Prey on Predators"), a Connecticut-based group, is one of several similar online groups operating in the United States.

Wanted Pedo is the main French association struggling against paedophile networks. Their website have been suspended by justice for exposing paedophile websites.

Criticism of tactics
A representative of the National Center for Missing and Exploited Children's Exploited Child Unit has stated that the  NCMEC does not condone investigations by citizens because according to the NCMEC, those actions do not deter predators and can push the predators to move to other locations and become more effective at hiding their identities.  The Internet safety organization CyberAngels, an offshoot of the Guardian Angels echoes similar concerns. Police officials in the past have been opposed to working with such groups, or have done so only reluctantly.

A paper from the University of East Anglia states that pedophile hunters might "have the effect of unduly diverting criminal justice resources from sex offenders who pose a considerable risk to the public towards low-risk offenders, the so-called ‘low-hanging fruit'", and that "Paedophile-hunting groups can circumvent procedural safeguards and regulations that exist to moderate state power and protect the human rights of those subject to a criminal process."

Anti-pedophile groups have also extensively been criticised by police for 'jeopardising police work', and for the propensity of some vigilantes to attack, abuse and threaten the people they lure. Question has also been levelled on whether the actions of these vigilante groups constitutes entrapment. In 2017, a sting by 'The Hunted One' involving a team of hunters luring an Indian man to Bluewater Shopping Centre ended with a crowd of men storming the area after watching it on Facebook Live, brutally attacking the man the hunters had lured with punches and kicks before they were restrained by security. Following the sting, two of the hunters involved were arrested by police.

See also

Anti-pornography movement
Chris Forcand
Ephebophilia
Hebephilia
To Catch a Predator - A Dateline NBC series that collaborated with Perverted-Justice
John Wojnowski
Maxim Martsinkevich

References

External links
Measurement and Analysis of P2P Activity Against Paedophile Content
Internet Watch Foundation
"Counter-terror methods used online to trap paedophiles" Guardian UK technology article

Anti-pedophile activism
Sexual abuse victims advocacy
Vigilantism against sex offenders